Robert McCray (born March 24, 1996) is an American football outside linebacker who is a free agent. He played college football at the Indiana.

Professional career

Kansas City Chiefs
McCray was signed by the Kansas City Chiefs as an undrafted free agent on May 8, 2018. He was waived at the end of training camp at the end of training camp and subsequently re-signed to the team's practice squad. He was waived again at the end of training camp in 2019.

McCray was drafted by the New York Guardians of the XFL. He was drafted in phase 5 which was an open draft where teams could select any player position, but never signed with the league.

Cleveland Browns
McCray was signed to the Cleveland Browns's practice squad on November 27, 2019. He was promoted to the Browns' active roster on December 21, 2019. McCray made his NFL Debut on December 22, 2019 against the Baltimore Ravens, finishing the game with one tackle.

McCray was waived by the Browns on September 5, 2020.

Detroit Lions
On January 14, 2021, McCray signed a reserve/futures contract with the Detroit Lions. He was waived on August 23, 2021.

References

External links
Indiana Hoosiers bio

1996 births
Living people
People from Rockdale County, Georgia
Sportspeople from the Atlanta metropolitan area
Players of American football from Georgia (U.S. state)
American football defensive ends
Indiana Hoosiers football players
Kansas City Chiefs players
Cleveland Browns players
Detroit Lions players